Ambia thyridialis is a moth in the family Crambidae. It was described by Julius Lederer in 1855. It is found in Syria and Lebanon.

References

Moths described in 1855
Musotiminae
Moths of Asia